The Chadwick House in Alberton, Montana, located at 320 Railroad St., was built in 1922.  It was listed on the National Register of Historic Places in 1997.

It is a single family Bungalow-style house with a wood, single-car garage and carport which is a second contributing building.

It was identified as Kern House in its NRHP application photos.

References

Houses on the National Register of Historic Places in Montana
Houses completed in 1922
National Register of Historic Places in Mineral County, Montana
1922 establishments in Montana
Bungalow architecture in Montana